was a Japanese boy band from the talent agency Johnny & Associates. Four Leaves was one of the earliest acts produced by the agency, and the four-member group first formed in 1967 and made their record debut with the single  the following year. They disbanded in 1978 due to popularity loss, but they reunited in 2002 until 2009.

Members
Toshio Egi (1967-1978, 2002–2009)
Kōji Kita (1967-1978, 2002–2009; died 2012)
Masao Orimo (1967-1978, 2002–2009)
Takashi Aoyama (1968-1978, 2002–2009; died 2009)
Eiji Nagata (1967-1968)

Kōhaku Uta Gassen Appearances

References

Japanese-language singers
Japanese boy bands
Japanese idol groups
Japanese pop music groups
Johnny & Associates
Musical groups established in 1967
1967 establishments in Japan
Musical groups from Tokyo